The D'Antignac House near Crescent, Georgia was a historic house built c. 1790, when George Washington was president, that is listed on the National Register of Historic Places.

It was a Federal style raised coastal cottage.

It was demolished without warning to neighbors or anyone else on the night of July 8–9, 2007, and the property was listed for sale at $5,175,000.  The property had been rezoned to allow development on the property with condition that the historic house be preserved.

References

External links
D'Antignac family cemetery, at Findagrave

Houses on the National Register of Historic Places in Georgia (U.S. state)
Federal architecture in Georgia (U.S. state)
Houses completed in 1790
National Register of Historic Places in McIntosh County, Georgia